Michael Garciaparra (born April 2, 1983 in Whittier, California) is an American former professional baseball shortstop. He is the brother of Nomar Garciaparra.

Career
Garciaparra was drafted by the Seattle Mariners in the supplemental 1st round (36th overall) of the 2001 Major League Baseball draft with the pick awarded to the Mariners after the free agent departure of Alex Rodriguez. Garciaparra was so highly touted, Upper Deck put his image on the pack wrappers and promotional materials for one of their brands, UD Prospect Premieres.

In , after being claimed off of waivers by the Philadelphia Phillies, Garciaparra was assigned to their Double-A Reading Phillies. By the end of the year, he had been promoted to Triple-A Ottawa. He began 2008 as a member of the Baltimore Orioles organization, playing for their Double-A Bowie Baysox. He was later released and signed by the Milwaukee Brewers and was assigned to their Double-A Huntsville Stars. In 2009, he began the season with the Triple-A Nashville Sounds, but was sent back to Huntsville on June 27. In 2010, he split his time between Round Rock Express of the Pacific Coast League and Corpus Christi Hooks of the Texas League before he retired from baseball.

Post career
Garciaparra is now an area scout in Southern California for the St. Louis Cardinals and former instructor for USA Baseball. He and father Ramon Garciaparra operate Garciaparra Baseball Group.

Personal
Garciaparra resides in Redondo Beach, California, and graduated from Don Bosco Technical Institute in June 2001. While there, he was named First Team All-Camino Real League in baseball for three years, handled kicking duties for the school's football team, and played varsity soccer. He missed most of the 2001 high school baseball season while recovering from surgery to repair a torn ACL sustained in a football game.

References

"Michael Garciaparra." Nashville Sounds. Retrieved on 26 June 2009.

External links

 Career statistics and player information from MiLB
 Career statistics and player information from CBS Sportline

1983 births
Living people
American baseball players of Mexican descent
American expatriate baseball players in Canada
Arizona League Mariners players
Baseball second basemen
Clearwater Threshers players
Corpus Christi Hooks players
Everett AquaSox players
Huntsville Stars players
Inland Empire 66ers of San Bernardino players
Nashville Sounds players
Ottawa Lynx players
Peoria Javelinas players
Reading Phillies players
Round Rock Express players
San Antonio Missions players
Sportspeople from Redondo Beach, California
Sportspeople from Whittier, California
St. Louis Cardinals scouts
Tacoma Rainiers players
Wisconsin Timber Rattlers players